Janassa is an extinct genus of petalodont cartilaginous fish that lived in marine environments in what is now central United States of America and Europe during the Carboniferous and upper Permian.  

It is known from teeth and a few poorly preserved body fossils from Germany (Kupferschiefer, Upper Permian) and England (Marl Slate, Upper Permian).  

According to the fossils, Janassa had a body plan very similar to that of the modern skate. Its teeth suggest it crushed and ate shellfish, such as brachiopods.

References

Petalodontiformes
Carboniferous fish of North America
Carboniferous cartilaginous fish
Permian cartilaginous fish
Permian fish of Europe
Prehistoric cartilaginous fish genera
Fossils of Germany
Kupferschiefer
Fossil taxa described in 1899